Gillian Ramchand (born 1965) is a linguist and Professor of Linguistics at the University of Tromsø, Norway.

Biography
Ramchand grew up in Jamaica and Trinidad and received her PhD in linguistics from Stanford University in 1994, with a dissertation entitled, "Aspect and Argument Structure in Modern Scottish Gaelic." She subsequently spent 10 years working at the University of Oxford as a lecturer in general linguistics before moving to Tromsø in 2004, where she became full professor two years later in 2006.

Her widely cited research focuses on the syntax-semantics interface, especially argument structure. She has worked on a variety of languages, including Scottish Gaelic, Bengali, and English.

Honors and distinctions 
Since 2017 Ramchand has been President of Generative Linguistics in the Old World (GLOW).

In 2018 Ramchand was elected to the Academy of Europe.

Selected publications
 Ramchand, Gillian. 1997. Aspect and predication: The semantics of argument structure. Oxford: Oxford University Press. 
 Adger, David, and Ramchand, Gillian. 2005. Merge and Move: Wh-dependencies revisited. Linguistic Inquiry 36(2), 161–193.
 Ramchand, Gillian, and Reiss, Charles. 2007. The Oxford handbook of linguistic interfaces. Oxford: Oxford University Press. 
 Ramchand, Gillian. 2008. Verb meaning and the lexicon: A first phase syntax. Cambridge: Cambridge University Press. 
 Ramchand, Gillian, and Svenonius, Peter. 2014. Deriving the functional hierarchy. Language Sciences 46, 152–174.
 Ramchand, Gillian. 2018. Situations and syntactic structures: Rethinking auxiliaries and order in English. Cambridge, MA: MIT Press.

References

Women linguists
Living people
Academic staff of the University of Tromsø
Semanticists
Syntacticians
Year of birth missing (living people)

1965 births